Summer solstice is the astronomical phenomenon that occurs on the longest day of the year.

Summer solstice may also refer to:
 June solstice, of the Northern Hemisphere
 December solstice, of the Southern Hemisphere

Arts and entertainment
 Summer Solstice (1981 film), an American dramatic film
 Summer Solstice (2005 film), made-for-television film based on a story by Rosamunde Pilcher
 Summer Solstice (2003 film), independent feature film directed by George Fivas, based on the story "Atlantic Summer" by Jeffrey Gold
 Summer Solstice: Bee Stings, 1998 experimental music album, part 2 of the four part Seasons collective created by Coil
 The Summer Solstice (film), a 2007 Chinese film
 Summer Solstice (album), 1971 folk music album by Maddy Prior and Tim Hart
 "The Summer Solstice", a Filipino short story written by Nick Joaquin
 MTV Unplugged – Summer Solstice, 2017 live album by a-ha

See also
 Midsummer (disambiguation)
 Summer (disambiguation)
 Solstice (disambiguation)
 Winter solstice (disambiguation)
 Autumnal equinox (disambiguation)
 Spring equinox (disambiguation)